is a Japanese actress and voice actress. She is affiliated with Office Osawa.

Biography
Having been interested in anime since junior high, Kohara enrolled into Human Academy after graduating from high school to pursue her dream of becoming a voice actress. After a two-year stint as an actress from 2012 to 2014, she joined her current voice actress agency Office Osawa. She made her voice acting debut in 2016. Her first major breakthrough came in 2017 with the role of Akane Mizuno in Tsuki ga Kirei. In 2019, she voiced Chika Fujiwara in Kaguya-sama: Love Is War. Chikatto Chika Chika​♡, her character's dance song she sang at the end of episode 3 became hugely popular, surpassing 20 million views on YouTube in just 18 months. 

In 2020, her web radio program Kohara Konomi no Kokoro Okinaku won the Best Comfort Radio award at the 6th Aniradi Awards.

She often professes her love for the retail chain MUJI, having previously worked there as an employee.

She has two pastel calico cats, Mil and Mash.

Filmography

Television animation
2016
Bakuon!! as club member
Handa-kun as Haru Wada, female student
Mobile Suit Gundam: Iron-Blooded Orphans as student

2017
Classroom of the Elite as Akane Tachibana
Magical Circle Guru Guru as Kukuri, Miucha (ep. 20)
Tsuki ga Kirei as Akane Mizuno

2018
Asobi Asobase as Kasumi Nomura
Bloom Into You as Koyomi Kanou
Hanebado! as Erena Fujisawa
School Babysitters as Kirin Kumatsuka
Teasing Master Takagi-san as Mina Hibino

2019
Azur Lane as HMS Sheffield
Demon Slayer: Kimetsu no Yaiba as Hanako Kamado
Domestic Girlfriend as Miu Ashihara
Hitori Bocchi no Marumaru Seikatsu as Kai Yawara
Kaguya-sama: Love Is War as Chika Fujiwara
Oresuki as Luna "Tsukimi" Kusami
Star☆Twinkle PreCure as Lala Hagoromo / Cure Milky
Sword Art Online: Alicization as Fizel
Teasing Master Takagi-san 2 as Mina Hibino
The Demon Girl Next Door as Yūko Yoshida / Shamiko

2020
A Certain Scientific Railgun T as Dolly
Asteroid in Love as Chikage Sakurai
Fly Me to the Moon as Chitose Kaginoji 
Kaguya-sama: Love Is War? as Chika Fujiwara
Mewkledreamy as Nana-chan
Our Last Crusade or the Rise of a New World as Kissing Zoa Nebulis IX
Seton Academy: Join the Pack! as Miyubi Shisho
Wandering Witch: The Journey of Elaina as Amnesia

2021
Dragon Quest: The Adventure of Dai as Merle
Mushoku Tensei: Jobless Reincarnation as Roxy Migurdia
Tesla Note as Botan Negoro
To Your Eternity as Oopa
Vivy: Fluorite Eye's Song as Yuzuka Kirishima
Waccha PriMagi! as Patano

2022
A Couple of Cuckoos as Sachi Umino
Akebi's Sailor Uniform as Minoru Ohkuma
Classroom of the Elite 2nd Season as Akane Tachibana
How a Realist Hero Rebuilt the Kingdom as Genia Maxwell
In the Heart of Kunoichi Tsubaki as Rindō
Kaguya-sama: Love Is War – Ultra Romantic as Chika Fujiwara
Miss Shachiku and the Little Baby Ghost as Myako
Princess Connect! Re:Dive Season 2 as Yuni
Teasing Master Takagi-san 3 as Mina Hibino
The Demon Girl Next Door Season 2 as Yūko Yoshida / Shamiko

2023
Classroom of the Elite 3rd Season as Akane Tachibana
Fly Me to the Moon 2nd Season as Chitose Kaginoji
My One-Hit Kill Sister as Kuon

2024
Whisper Me a Love Song as Mari Tsutsui

Theatrical animation
 The Irregular at Magic High School: The Movie – The Girl Who Summons the Stars (2017) as Kokoa Watatsumi
 Pompo: The Cinéphile (2021) as Joelle Davidovich "Pompo" Pomponett
 Teasing Master Takagi-san: The Movie (2022) as Mina
 Kaguya-sama: Love Is War – The First Kiss That Never Ends (2022) as Chika Fujiwara

Video games
2018
Summer Pockets as Shiroha Naruse
2019
MahjongSoul as Keikumusume, Hana Ninomiya
2020
Genshin Impact as Mona
Fire Emblem Heroes as Reginn
2021
Blue Archive as Arona
2022
Trinity Trigger as Flam
Kokoro Clover Season 1 as Treffy
Return to Shironagasu Island as Abigail Ellison
Little Witch Nobeta as Nobeta
Tower of Fantasy as Tsubasa

Drama CDs
Wandering Witch: The Journey of Elaina (2018) as Amnesia

Live-Action film
L DK (2014) as Reina (Aoi's Classmate)

References

External links
  
 

1992 births
Crunchyroll Anime Awards winners
Living people
Japanese video game actresses
Japanese voice actresses
Voice actresses from Kanagawa Prefecture